Events from the year 1855 in Germany.

Incumbents
 King of Bavaria – Maximilian II
 King of Hanover – George V
 King of Prussia – Frederick William IV
 King of Saxony – John of Saxony

Events 
 The cocaine alkaloid is first isolated by German chemist Friedrich Gaedcke

Births 
 February 17 – Otto Liman von Sanders, German general (d. 1929)
 February 24 – Johannes von Eben, German general (d. 1924 )
 May 9 – Julius Röntgen, German-Dutch classical composer (d. 1932)
 June 28 – Theodor Reuss, German occultist (d. 1923)
 July 26 – Ferdinand Tönnies, German sociologist (d. 1936)
 August 25 – Hugo von Pohl, German admiral (d. 1916)
 August 27 – Hugo von Kathen, German general (d. 1932)
 September 9 – Houston Stewart Chamberlain, British-born German writer (d. 1927)
 October 10 – Eduard von Capelle, German admiral (d. 1931)

Deaths 

 February 23 – Carl Friedrich Gauss, German mathematician, astronomer, and physicist (b. 1777)

Years of the 19th century in Germany
Germany
Germany